National security directives are presidential directives issued for the National Security Council (NSC). Starting with Harry Truman, every president since the founding of the National Security Council in 1947 has issued national security directives in one form or another, which have involved foreign, military and domestic policies. National security directives are generally highly classified and are available to the public only after "a great many years" have elapsed. Unlike executive orders, national security directives are usually directed only to the National Security Council and the most senior executive branch officials, and embody foreign and military policy-making guidance rather than specific instructions.

Names for national security directives by administration
Presidents have issued such directives under various names.

Truman and Eisenhower administrations
National security directives were quite different in the early period of the Cold War. A 1988 General Accounting Office (GAO) investigation into national security directives left out the directives from the Truman and Eisenhower years because "they were not structured in a way to allow categorization." The study nevertheless made note of two types of directives. The first was "policy papers" which could contain policy recommendations, in which case the president might decide to approve the policy by writing his signature. A famous example of such a policy paper is NSC 68. GAO also noted another type of directive called "NSC Actions", which were "numbered records of decisions that were reached at NSC meetings.

Kennedy and Johnson administrations
The Kennedy administration which took office in 1961 reorganized the NSC and began issuing National Security Action Memoranda (NSAMs). Many NSAMs were signed in Kennedy's name by National Security Advisor McGeorge Bundy, although Kennedy sometimes signed them personally. Lyndon B. Johnson continued issuing NSAMs where Kennedy left off, although issuing only 99 directives as compared to Kennedy's 273.

Reagan administration
A 1986 National Security Decision Directive gave the State Department authority and responsibility to coordinate responses to international terrorism across government agencies including the CIA, DoD, and FBI. This was intended to reduce interagency conflicts which were observed in the response to the hijacking of the Achille Lauro cruise ship. The State Department's Bureau of Counterterrorism continues this coordinating function.

Homeland Security Presidential Directive 

After September 11, 2001, George W. Bush issued Homeland Security Presidential Directives (HSPDs), with the consent of the Homeland Security Council. These directives were sometimes issued concurrently as national security directives.

Secrecy 
Regarding the secrecy of presidential directives, Steven Aftergood of the Federation of American Scientists' Project on Government Secrecy stated in February 2008 that:

Of the 54 National Security Presidential Directives issued by the (George W.) Bush Administration to date, the titles of only about half have been publicly identified.  There is descriptive material or actual text in the public domain for only about a third.  In other words, there are dozens of undisclosed Presidential directives that define U.S. national security policy and task government agencies, but whose substance is unknown either to the public or, as a rule, to Congress.

However, in an unprecedented development, the Trump administration ordered their national security directives to be published in the Federal Register.

See also 
 Presidential directive
 PDD-62
 Continuity of Operations Plan
 National Security and Homeland Security Presidential Directive (NSPD-51)

Notes

References

External links

 Presidential Directives and Executive Orders, a comprehensive listing of national security directives by the Federation of American Scientists
National security directives at presidential libraries
 National Security Action Memoranda, at the John F. Kennedy Presidential Library
 National Security Action Memorandums, at the Lyndon B. Johnson Presidential Library
 National Security Study Memoranda and National Security Decision Memoranda, at the Richard Nixon Presidential Library
 National Security Study Memoranda and National Security Decision Memoranda, at the Gerald R. Ford Presidential Library
 Presidential Review Memoranda and Presidential Directives, at the Jimmy Carter Presidential Library
 National Security Study Directives and National Security Decision Directives, at the Ronald Reagan Presidential Library
 National Security Reviews and National Security Directives, at the George H. W. Bush Presidential Library
 Presidential Review Directives and Presidential Decision Directives, at the William J. Clinton Presidential Library
 National Security Presidential Directives, at the George W. Bush Presidential Library

Foreign relations of the United States
Presidency of the United States
United States federal law
United States
United States national security directives